Trevitt's Addition Historic District is a neighborhood, primarily residential in character, located in The Dalles, Oregon, United States. Victor Trevitt platted the first expansion of the original 1855 "Dalles City" townsite in 1860, and continued to extend his addition in response to economic developments. The district saw the first flour mill and electrical and water systems in The Dalles, one of the area's earliest Catholic churches, and direct connection to transportation networks including the Columbia River Highway and the railroad. Surviving buildings in the district reflect a continuous spectrum of architectural styles from 1864 to 1937.

The historic district was listed on the National Register of Historic Places in 1995.

See also
National Register of Historic Places listings in Wasco County, Oregon
Bennett–Williams House
Old St. Peter's Landmark
Original Wasco County Courthouse
Edward French House

References

External links

The Dalles, Oregon
Historic districts on the National Register of Historic Places in Oregon
National Register of Historic Places in Wasco County, Oregon